Malik Saif ad-Dīn Aibak Yughantat was a governor of Bengal (Lakhnauti) under the Mamluk dynasty of Delhi from 1232 to 1236. He was the first of the slave-officers to govern Bengal.

Early life
Aibak was a Khitan of the Turco-Persian tradition. He was purchased as a slave by Iltutmish from the heirs of Ikhtiyar ad-Din Chust Qaba. Through his hard work and efforts, he managed to rise through the ranks, becoming the more powerful amongst the Maliks and titled Amir al-Majlis. He was given the iqta' of 28 wilayat in Sursuti by 1227. He was later stationed in Bihar.

Governor of Bengal
After the dismissal of Alauddin Jani, the Sultan appointed Aibak to be the next governor of Bengal. During his governorship, Aibak took on an expedition to South Bengal with the intention of capturing elephants. His expedition was successful, capturing a number of elephants, and dispatching several of them to the Sultan. Iltutmish was pleased with Aibak and conferred him the title of "Yughantat". Aibak married his daughter to Malik Qamaruddin Kiran Timur Khan.

Death
It is said that he was assassinated or poisoned in April 1236 AD by a rebellious courtier named Awar Khan Aibak. Awar Khan was quickly defeated and Sultan Iltutmish commanded Tughral Tughan Khan, who had succeeded Saifuddin in Bihar, to succeed as governor of Bengal following Saifuddin's death.

See also
List of rulers of Bengal
History of Bengal
History of Bangladesh
History of India

References

Governors of Bengal
1236 deaths
13th-century Indian Muslims
13th-century Indian monarchs
Year of birth unknown